CCM Hockey is a Canadian manufacturer of ice hockey equipment. CCM was formerly an initialism for Canada Cycle & Motor Co. Ltd., a bicycle manufacturer that began producing hockey as a secondary business. The original company went bankrupt in 1983, though both product lines were continued under new, separate ownership. 

The CCM trademark continues to be used by two separate entities: CCM Hockey, formerly The Hockey Company, manufacturing hockey equipment, and CCM Cycle, manufacturing bicycles.

CCM Hockey is currently owned by Canadian private equity firm Birch Hill Equity Partners, after the Adidas Group sold the brand for around $100 million in 2017.
As of June 2021, the newly appointed CEO by Birch Hill Equity Partners is Marrouane Nabih. Since then, the company has gone through major changes and restructuring within the senior management group.

CCM's range of products for hockey includes sticks, skates, helmets, shoulder pads, elbow pads, goaltender masks, goaltender pads, goaltender gloves, knee pads, throat collars, and team uniforms for the American Hockey League.

History 
CCM was founded in 1899 after the collapse of the bicycle market. Established "when the operations of four major Canadian bicycle manufacturers amalgamated: H. A. Lozier, Massey-Harris, Goold, and Welland Vale Manufacturing." CCM produced bicycles for many years in the area of Weston, Toronto, Ontario. They also briefly produced the Russell automobile.

By 1905, with saturation in the bicycle market, CCM began producing hockey skates using scrap steel that was left over at the plant from the manufacture of bicycles and automobiles, and subsequently began manufacturing other hockey gear.

In 1937, CCM acquired the Tackaberry brand made by a Manitoban named George Tackaberry and "Tacks" remained the company's signature skate until late 2006, when the Tacks line was replaced with the "Vector" line, then the "U+" line, and"RBZ" line, now the "Jetspeed" line. The "Tacks" line was later reintroduced in 2014.

The original CCM went bankrupt in 1983. All of the assets of the company were purchased by Procycle Group Inc. of Quebec who retained the bicycle division and sold off the hockey division to Montreal businessman David Zunenshine who owned GC Knitting, a manufacturer of hockey jerseys. The company subsequently used the CCM brand when producing hockey equipment.

The company entered the toy industry in 1988 through the acquisition of Coleco Industries and in 1990 when they acquired another financially troubled company, Buddy L Corp., a 70-year-old manufacturer of steel and plastic toy cars and trucks based in the United States.

 
In 1991, the company incorporated and took the name "SLM International" Inc. SLM purchased Kevin Sports Toys International Inc. (the maker of the Wayne Gretzky NHL hockey game), Norca Industries Inc. (a plastic toy manufacturer of such products as swimming pools, sleds, and sandboxes), and Innova-Dex Sports Inc. of Montreal (a bicycle helmet manufacturer).

SLM filed for Chapter 11 bankruptcy protection in 1995, selling off Buddy L and the SLM Fitness equipment business. The company emerged from bankruptcy protection in 1997 and reorganized. The company acquired Montreal-based Sports Holdings, Inc, in 1998, and became the world's top producer of hockey merchandise adding the brands Koho, Titan, Jofa, Canadien and Heaton. Titan and Canadien were well-known brands of wooden hockey sticks in the 1980s and 1990s, with Wayne Gretzky having used the Titan 2020 while playing with the Edmonton Oilers. Heaton was known for its goaltending equipment, which was used for years by Martin Brodeur as well as many other NHL goaltenders.

In 1999, SLM was renamed The Hockey Company. In June 2004, The Hockey Company was bought by Reebok. All brands other than the CCM brand were retired and Reebok introduced its own RBK Hockey gear, later to be rebranded as Reebok Hockey. Reebok in turn was acquired by Adidas in 2005.

In the fall of 2013, The Hockey Company created a new goaltending equipment line under the CCM brand name. Beginning in 2015, The Hockey Company began phasing out the Reebok name from their hockey equipment lines, by creating equivalent or similar product lines under the CCM name.  CCM is now the only brand name used by the company on its hockey equipment.

In 2017, Adidas sold CCM to a Canadian private equity firm, Birch Hill Equity Partners, for around $100 million. In 2018 CCM hired a new CEO, Rick Blackshaw. Blackshaw told the media that "We have some nice momentum. We're seeking to make investment in product and product innovation and the brand.

As of June 2021, the newly appointed CEO by Birch Hill Equity Partners is Marrouane Nabih.

Products and marketing 
CCM manufactures a wide range of ice hockey equipment at all price points, from recreational to professional. One major rival is Bauer Hockey. CCM is one of the official licensees, sponsors, and on-ice suppliers of hockey equipment for the National Hockey League (NHL) until 2014. CCM has changed its logo multiple times but use all three.

NHL player George Parsons was forced to retire due to a career-ending eye injury in 1939. He then became involved with CCM hockey, helping to develop helmets and facial protection which would be safer for players. By early 1976, CCM had developed a hockey helmet complete with eye and face shield and lower face protector that was both approved by the Canadian Standards Association and endorsed by the Canadian Amateur Hockey Association.

Main endorsers of CCM players gear include Sidney Crosby, Alex Ovechkin, Patrice Bergeron, Nathan MacKinnon and, Connor McDavid.

In recent decades, CCM has been one of the most used goalie pads in the NHL. This popularity was in large part due to CCM's partnership with Quebec-based goalie equipment company Équipements de gardien de but (EGB) (name stylized as 'Lefevre on products and marketing materials), a family business that began making hockey equipment in the 1970s. Some notable goalies that used CCM were Marc-Andre Fleury and Carey Price. During 2020 CCM and Lefebvre decided to end their partnership. Today CCM offers the Extreme Flex, Axis, and the youth YT Flex goalie products.

See also

 CCM (bicycle company)
 Reebok

References

External links

 

Canadian brands
Sportswear brands
Motorized bicycles
Sporting goods manufacturers of Canada
Companies based in Montreal
Canadian companies established in 1899
Ice hockey brands
Bandy brands
Manufacturing companies established in 1899